Hasanaliler Church is a church ruin in Mersin Province, Turkey.

Hasanaliler is the name of a village which is now a neighborhood of Narlıkuyu in Silifke ilçe (district). Cennet and Cehennem sinkholes are nearby.

The church is a 6th-century Byzantine church. It is a basilica-type church. The nartex of the three nave church is to the west of the building. There is a cistern under the building.

References

Churches in Turkey
Buildings and structures in Mersin Province
Archaeology of Turkey
Silifke District
Byzantine sacred architecture
Olba territorium